A slave fort or slave castle was a fortification designed to provide an area in which enslaved victims could be imprisoned as well as constituting a significant defendable location in the event of an outside attack. A slave fort was a militarised factory (trading post) which evolved at locations where the slave trade played a significant economic role on the coast of Africa. These forts were built by organisations from nine European countries, whether by the state or chartered companies.

Portuguese origins
In 1441 Henry the Navigator initiated the Portuguese exploration of the African coast. With the newly designed ship, the caravel Portuguese explorers were able to sail further south along the coast. However, their exploration was accompanied by repeated kidnapping of particularly Berbers who were enslaved and sold at newly created slave markets in Lisbon. Nuno Tristão and Gonçalo de Sintra explored as far south as the Bay of Arguin, where the Portuguese established a trading post at the island of Arguin. Henry ordered the first feitoria or factory to be built there in 1448, although there are also records that King Afonso V also ordered a fort to be built in 1462.

Elmina Castle was built in 1482 in present-day Elmina, Ghana (formerly the Gold Coast). It was the first of many slave forts built by Europeans along the coast of West Africa. João II decided to build the fort shortly after coming to the Portuguese throne. He appointed Diogo de Azambuja to fulfill the task, and supplying him with a pre-fabricated fort in kit form, along with 600 men. This enabled the fort to be built as the first European prefabricated building in sub-saharan Africa. This proved useful as the indigenous people did not want the Portuguese to build the fort despite Azambuja initial success in some negotiations.

References

Fortified settlements
Forts